Anathallis welteri is a species of orchid plant native to Brazil.

References 

welteri
Flora of Brazil